The Adams House in Mercer County, Kentucky, near Salvisa, was listed on the National Register of Historic Places in 1989.

Its architectural style is deemed "settlement vernacular".  It was deemed significant, "as an example of the dogtrot house form made of hewn logs. It is also significant for the interior ornamentation of hand painted watermelon pattern on the walls."

References

Houses on the National Register of Historic Places in Kentucky
National Register of Historic Places in Mercer County, Kentucky
Log houses in the United States
Log buildings and structures on the National Register of Historic Places in Kentucky
Houses in Mercer County, Kentucky
Dogtrot architecture in Kentucky